This is a listing of the history of the World Record in the 100 breaststroke swimming event.

The first world record in long course (50 metres) swimming was recognized by the International Swimming Federation (FINA) in 1961, while the women's world record times were officially acknowledged in 1958. In the short course (25 metres) swimming events the world's governing body recognizes world records since 3 March 1991.

Men

Long course

Short course

Women

Long course

Short course

All-time top 25

Men long course
Correct as of March 2023

Notes
Below is a list of other times equal or superior to 58.96:
Adam Peaty also swam 57.10 (2018), 57.13 (2016), 57.14 (2019), 57.37 (2021), 57.39 (2021), 57.47 (2017), 57.55 (2016), 57.56 (2021), 57.59 (2019), 57.62 (2016), 57.63 (2021), 57.66 (2021), 57.67 (2021), 57.70 (2021), 57.75 (2017), 57.79 (2017), 57.87 (2019), 57.89 (2018), 57.92 (2015), 58.04 (2018), 58.13 (2020), 58.15 (2019), 58.18 (2015), 58.21 (2017), 58.22 (2021), 58.26 (2021), 58.36 (2016), 58.41 (2016), 58.50 (2019), 58.52 (2015, 2015), 58.56 (2017), 58.58 (2022), 58.59 (2018), 58.61 (2018), 58.68 (2014), 58.72 (2017, 2019), 58.73 (2019), 58.74 (2016, 2016), 58.78 (2018, 2019, 2020), 58.82 (2017, 2021), 58.84 (2018), 58.86 (2017), 58.87 (2021), 58.90 (2020), 58.92 (2019), 58.94 (2014, 2016, 2017), 58.96 (2014).
Arno Kamminga also swam 57.90 (2021), 58.00 (2021), 58.10 (2021), 58.18 (2021), 58.19 (2021), 58.40 (2021), 58.42 (2021), 58.43 (2020), 58.47 (2021), 58.52 (2020, 2022), 58.61 (2020), 58.62 (2022), 58.64 (2021), 58.65 (2019), 58.68 (2021, 2022), 58.69 (2020, 2022), 58.71 (2022), 58.74 (2021), 58.77 (2021), 58.78 (2020), 58.85 (2022), 58.89 (2022), 58.90 (2022), 58.94 (2022), 58.95 (2020).
Michael Andrew also swam 58.19 (2021), 58.51 (2022), 58.62 (2021), 58.67 (2021), 58.73 (2021), 58.78 (2022), 58.82 (2021), 58.84 (2021), 58.96 (2022).
Nicolò Martinenghi also swam 58.28 (2022), 58.29 (2021), 58.33 (2021), 58.37 (2021), 58.44 (2022), 58.45 (2021), 58.46 (2022), 58.57 (2022), 58.68 (2021), 58.75 (2019), 58.78 (2022), 58.88 (2021), 58.94 (2021).
Ilya Shymanovich also swam 58.46 (2021), 58.49 (2019), 58.58 (2019), 58.68 (2021), 58.73 (2019), 58.75 (2021), 58.77 (2021), 58.79 (2019), 58.87 (2019).
Cameron van der Burgh also swam 58.49 (2015), 58.59 (2015, 2015), 58.69 (2016), 58.83 (2012), 58.95 (2009), 58.97 (2013, 2015).
Nic Fink also swam 58.50 (2021), 58.55 (2022), 58.65 (2022), 58.80 (2021), 58.81 (2022).
James Wilby also swam 58.58 (2021), 58.64 (2018), 58.66 (2019), 58.76 (2021), 58.80 (2021), 58.83 (2019), 58.93 (2022), 58.96 (2021).
Yan Zibei also swam 58.67 (2019), 58.72 (2021), 58.73 (2020), 58.74 (2019), 58.75 (2021), 58.83 (2020), 58.87 (2021), 58.92 (2017), 58.96 (2019).
Kevin Cordes also swam 58.74 (2017), 58.79 (2017), 58.94 (2016).
Andrew Wilson also swam 58.80 (2021), 58.93 (2019), 58.95 (2019).
Yasuhiro Koseki also swam 58.86 (2018), 58.89 (2019), 58.91 (2016, 2019), 58.93 (2019), 58.96 (2018).
Christian Sprenger also swam 58.87 (2014), 58.93 (2012).
Kosuke Kitajima also swam 58.91 (2008).
Anton Chupkov also swam 58.94 (2019).

Men short course
Correct as of December 2022

Notes
Below is a list of other times equal or superior to 56.60:
Ilya Shymanovich also swam 55.32 (2021), 55.34 (2020), 55.45 (2021), 55.49 (2020), 55.59 (2021), 55.70 (2021), 55.77 (2021), 55.83 (2020), 56.04 (2020, 2021), 56.10 (2018), 56.20 (2021), 56.26 (2022), 56.43 (2018), 56.47 (2018), 56.54 (2021).
Adam Peaty also swam 55.49 (2020), 56.25 (2022), 56.42 (2022).
Nicolo Martinenghi also swam 55.80 (2021), 56.01 (2022), 56.07 (2022), 56.39 (2021), 56.46 (2020), 56.54 (2021), 56.60 (2022).
Arno Kamminga also swam 55.82 (2021), 55.99 (2021), 56.06 (2019, 2021), 56.08 (2021), 56.19 (2021), 56.26 (2021), 56.35 (2021), 56.41 (2021), 56.42 (2021), 56.46 (2021).
Nic Fink also swam 55.87 (2021), 55.88 (2022), 56.16 (2020), 56.25 (2022), 56.48 (2021), 56.51 (2021).
Cameron van der Burgh also swam 55.99 (2009), 56.01 (2018), 56.60 (2009).
Yasuhiro Koseki also swam 56.13 (2018), 56.42 (2018).
Emre Sakçı also swam 56.25 (2021), 56.47 (2021).
Kirill Prigoda also swam 56.28 (2017), 56.31 (2018), 56.54 (2022), 56.56 (2018).
Fabian Schwingenschlögl also swam 56.29 (2021).
Fabio Scozzoli also swam 56.30 (2018), 56.34 (2021), 56.48 (2018).
Qin Haiyang also swam 56.33 (2022), 56.38 (2022).
Danil Semianinov also swam 56.51 (2021).

Women long course
Correct as of August 2022

Notes
Below is a list of other times equal or superior to 1:05.78:
Ruta Meilutyte also swam 1:04.42 (2013), 1:04.52 (2013), 1:05.06 (2017), 1:05.20 (2013), 1:05.21 (2012, 2013, 2014), 1:05.39 (2014), 1:05.46 (2015), 1:05.47 (2012), 1:05.48 (2013), 1:05.56 (2012), 1:05.63 (2014), 1:05.64 (2015), 1:05.65 (2017), 1:05.68 (2015).
Lilly King also swam 1:04.53 (2017), 1:04.72 (2021), 1:04.79 (2021), 1:04.93 (2016, 2019), 1:04.95 (2017), 1:05.13 (2019), 1:05.20 (2016, 2017), 1:05.32 (2021, 2021, 2022), 1:05.36 (2018), 1:05.40 (2021), 1:05.44 (2018), 1:05.47 (2021), 1:05.54 (2021), 1:05.55 (2021), 1:05.61 (2018), 1:05.65 (2019), 1:05.66 (2019), 1:05.67 (2021, 2022), 1:05.68 (2019), 1:05.70 (2016, 2021), 1:05.73 (2016) 1:05.74 (2020), 1:05.76 (2018), 1:05.78 (2016).
Yuliya Yefimova also swam 1:04.82 (2017), 1:04.98 (2018), 1:05.02 (2013), 1:05.05 (2017), 1:05.24 (2013), 1:05.29 (2013, 2017), 1:05.41 (2009), 1:05.48 (2013), 1:05.49 (2019), 1:05.50 (2016), 1:05.51 (2019), 1:05.53 (2018), 1:05.56 (2019), 1:05.60 (2015, 2017), 1:05.66 (2015, 2017), 1:05.70 (2016), 1:05.72 (2016), 1:05.75 (2019), 1:05.77 (2019), 1:05.78 (2018).
Rebecca Soni also swam 1:04.91 (2011), 1:04.93 (2009, 2010), 1:05.05 (2011), 1:05.34 (2009), 1:05.54 (2011), 1:05.55 (2012), 1:05.57 (2011), 1:05.66 (2009), 1:05.73 (2009, 2010), 1:05.75 (2012).
Tatjana Schoenmaker also swam 1:05.07 (2021), 1:05.22 (2021), 1:05.74 (2021).
Leisel Jones also swam 1:05.17 (2008), 1:05.34 (2008), 1:05.60 (2006), 1:05.64 (2008), 1:05.66 (2010), 1:05.71 (2006), 1:05.72 (2007), 1:05.75 (2008).
Jessica Hardy also swam 1:05.18 (2013), 1:05.52 (2013).
Lydia Jacoby also swam 1:05.28 (2021), 1:05.52 (2021), 1:05.71 (2021), 1:05.72 (2021).
Katie Meili also swam 1:05.48 (2017), 1:05.51 (2017), 1:05.64 (2015), 1:05.69 (2016).
Annie Lazor also swam 1:05.60 (2021).
Anna Elendt also swam 1:05.62 (2022).
Lara van Niekerk also swam 1:05.67 (2022).
Sophie Hansson also swam 1:05.69 (2021, 2021).
Benedetta Pilato also swam 1:05.77 (2022).

Women short course
Correct as of December 2022

Notes
Below is a list of other times equal or superior to 1:04.01:
Alia Atkinson also swam 1:02.40 (2016), 1:02.54 (2014), 1:02.66 (2020), 1:02.67 (2017), 1:02.68 (2016), 1:03.56 (2020).
Rūta Meilutytė also swam 1:02.43 (2014), 1:02.46 (2014), 1:03.07 (2022), 1:03.40 (2022), 1:03.81 (2022).
Lilly King also swam 1:02.67 (2022), 1:03.33 (2022), 1:03.94 (2022).
Tang Qianting also swam 1:03.47 (2021).
Leisel Jones also swam 1:03.72 (2008).
Nika Godun also swam 1:03.77 (2021).
Tang Qianting also swam 1:03.99 (2021).

References
  Zwemkroniek - world records

Breaststroke 100 metres
World record progression 100 metres breaststroke